Jaime Mota de Farias (12 November 1925 – 13 April 2021) was a Brazilian Catholic bishop.

Mota de Farias was born in Brazil and was ordained to the priesthood in 1957. He served as auxiliary bishop of the Roman Catholic Diocese of Nazaré, Brazil, from 1982 to 1986 and as bishop of the Roman Catholic Diocese of Alagoinhas from 1986 to 2002.

Notes

1925 births
2021 deaths
20th-century Roman Catholic bishops in Brazil
21st-century Roman Catholic bishops in Brazil
Roman Catholic bishops of Alagoinhas
Roman Catholic bishops of Nazaré